Czaplino may refer to:
Czaplino, Podlaskie Voivodeship, a village in Białystok County, Poland
Czaplino, Greater Poland Voivodeship, a settlement in Piła County, Poland